The Vagabond Queen is a 1929 British comedy film directed by Géza von Bolváry and starring Betty Balfour, Glen Byam Shaw, and Ernest Thesiger. It was the final film directed in Britain by Bolváry before he returned to Germany. It was made by British International Pictures. A young woman takes the place of a Princess who is a target for an assassination.

Cast

References

Bibliography

External links

1929 films
1929 comedy films
Films shot at British International Pictures Studios
Films directed by Géza von Bolváry
1920s English-language films
British comedy films
British black-and-white films
1920s British films
English-language comedy films